The Victoria Hospital in Cairo, Egypt was founded by Viscountess Strangford with Dr Herbert Sieveking in 1883. The same year Queen Victoria awarded Strangford the Royal Red Cross for her work. The hospital continued in operation thanks to a grant of £2,000 per year from the Egyptian government taking in local students for training and offering first class accommodation on a private basis.

References

Hospitals in Cairo
Hospitals established in 1883